Chara vulgaris, the common stonewort, is a green alga species in the genus Chara.

See also 
 List of sequenced plastomes

References

External links

Charophyta
Plants described in 1753
Taxa named by Carl Linnaeus